Hypercompe ecpantherioides is a moth of the family Erebidae first described by Walter Rothschild in 1935. It is found in Panama.

References

Hypercompe
Moths described in 1935